Amelia "Amy" Richards (born February 9, 1970) is an American activist, organizer, writer, television producer, feminist, and art historian, currently residing in New York. She graduated from Barnard College in 1992. Richards has appeared on Fox’s The O'Reilly Factor, Oprah, Talk of the Nation, New York One and CNN. She produced the Emmy-nominated series Woman, which airs on Viceland. She is the president of Soapbox, Inc., a feminist lecture agency.

Early life 
Richards was born on February 9, 1970, in Alexandria, Virginia, to Albert Wentz and Karen Richards. She grew up in Pennsylvania. Her father, Wentz, was not a part of her life. She attended Tabor Academy, a private boarding school in Marion, Massachusetts. After graduating high school from Tabor, she graduated cum laude from Barnard College with a Bachelor of Arts in Art History in 1992. She was an NCAA Division I soccer player at Barnard. She is also a four-time marathon runner.

Career 
Richards embarked on an unexpected career as a feminist activist, writer, and organizer when she became involved in a summer project, Freedom Summer '92, a cross-country voter registration drive. She co-wrote Manifesta: Young Women, Feminism, and the Future  with Jennifer Baumgardner. The book was published by Farrar, Straus and Giroux in 2000 with an anniversary and updated edition published in 2010. She authored Opting In: Having a Child Without Losing Yourself, about feminism and motherhood, and is a co-author of Grassroots: A Field Guide for Feminist Activism. She wrote Insight Guides: Shopping in New York City. She also wrote the article "LIVES; When One is Enough", about her experience becoming pregnant with triplets, and deciding to terminate two of them, giving birth to the third. She and Marianne Schnall contributed the piece "Cyberfeminism: Networking the Net" to the 2003 anthology Sisterhood Is Forever: The Women's Anthology for a New Millennium, edited by Robin Morgan. Her writing has appeared in The Nation, The LA Times, Bust, Ms., and numerous anthologies, including Listen Up, Body Outlaws and Catching A Wave. She has tackled issues ranging from plastic surgery to abortion politics. She was the interim project director for Twilight: Los Angeles by Anna Deavere Smith. She is also the editor of I Still Believe Anita Hill, a collection of essays featuring Eve Ensler, Catharine MacKinnon, Lynn Nottage and others.

Third Wave Feminism 
Richards's leadership and visionary work launched her as a primary spokesperson and leading voice for young feminist issues. Since then she has assumed that role by lecturing at hundreds of venues, writing books and articles about feminism, and making numerous media appearances all in an attempt to confirm that younger people are making bold and transformative contributions to their communities. She is the voice to "Ask Amy", an online advice column she has run at feminist.com since 1995. In addition to writing, Richards is a producer. She produced Viceland's Woman, as well as being a consulting producer for Gloria Steinem: In Her Own Words for HBO and an advisor on MAKERS: Women Making America, a PBS documentary on the women's movement.

Richards is a co-founder of the Third Wave Foundation, which is now known as the Third Wave Fund, a national organization for young feminist activists between the ages of 15 and 30. The Third Wave Fund co-founded by Richards promotes gender justice, a movement to end patriarchy, transphobia, homophobia, and misogyny. The Fund creates a space where people have the comfortability to perform their gender based on how they want others to perceive them. Richards believes that gender justice enables youth to gain knowledge and learn how to fight against social norms placed by our society. Being able to teach the youth how to become leaders in society is a goal within the Third Wave fund. The Third Wave Fund gives the tools to those who identify as being in the LGBTQ community to have the resources and ability to lead powerful movements. Richards truly believes in the youth because she knows that the future is dependent on them.

In July 2002, she co-founded and became president of Soapbox Inc., an organization based on feminism. She served as a cultural attaché to the U.S. Embassy in Russia, consulting on women’s issues. She has been a long-time consultant to Gloria Steinem and Anna Deavere Smith, as well as the Columbia School of Public Health among other places. She serves on the boards and advisory boards of organizations such as Sadie Nash Leadership Project and Chicken & Egg Productions, feminist.com, Ms. Magazine, and Fair Fund. She is an abortion rights activist, having terminated the pregnancy of her twins within a pregnancy where she was expecting triplets.

Appearances and awards 
Richards has appeared in a range of media venues including Fox's The O’Reilly Factor, Oprah, Talk of the Nation, New York One and CNN. Woman, which she produced, is now Emmy nominated. In 2009, Richards was in residence at the writers retreat, Hedgebrook. She was first publicly distinguished as a leader in 1995 when Who Cares magazine chose her as one of twenty-five "Young Visionaries."

She went on to win many accolades:

 Ms. magazine, which profiled her in "21 for the 21st: Leaders for the Next Century."
 Women's Enews, which in 2003 named her one of their "Leaders for the 21st Century."
 The American Association of University Women, which chose her as a 2004 Woman of Distinction.
 Barnard College, which honored her for her achievements in 2007.

Books

References

External links 
 Soapbox profile
Third Wave Fund Profile

1970 births
Living people
American feminists
American women writers
Barnard College alumni
People from Alexandria, Virginia
Cultural attachés
21st-century American women